Stephen Comey (born in  London, England in 1963) is an English Australian actor.
He is the son of Irishman Albert Comey and his Australian wife Dennise Lee. The Comey's moved to Australia in 1969.

Biography 
Stephen Comey appeared in the Crawford Productions drama Cop Shop (1982), and ABC's Come Midnight Monday (1982)
but is best known for his role as Kevin Palmer in the television soap opera
Sons and Daughters. Steve appeared in the series from its debut in 1981 until 1984 for which he won the 1983 Logie Award for "Most Popular New Talent".

Other television productions that Stephen Comey has appeared in include Kennedy Miller's Vietnam, Seven's Hey Dad, Seven's Home and Away and Nine's The Flying Doctors.

Stage credits include the Sydney Theatre Company's Six Characters in Search of an Author and the Pavilion Theatre's The Lion in Winter for the Castle Hill Players.

Comey now works as the Senior Exhibition Manager for the Australian Water Association (AWA).

Comey is a founding member of Radioactive Live, a bespoke theatre company who perform timeless radio plays on stage in Sydney's Hills District. Radioactive Live was formed in 2012.

References

External links
 

1963 births
Australian male television actors
English emigrants to Australia
Living people
Logie Award winners
Male actors from London
English people of Irish descent
English people of Australian descent